Kalat (also Romanized as Kalāt; also known as Kalāt-e Koch and Kalāt-e Kūch) is a village in Zarabad-e Sharqi Rural District, Zarabad District, Konarak County, Sistan and Baluchestan Province, Iran. At the 2006 census, its population was 192, in 48 families.

References 

Populated places in Konarak County